Cyperus maderaspatanus is a species of sedge that is native to parts of eastern Africa and India.

See also 
 List of Cyperus species

References 

maderaspatanus
Plants described in 1797
Flora of Kenya
Flora of Malawi
Flora of Mozambique
Flora of India
Flora of Tanzania
Flora of Uganda
Taxa named by Carl Ludwig Willdenow